The 2004–05 English Hockey League season took place from September 2004 until May 2005.

The men's title was won by Cannock for the third consecutive year. The women's title went to Leicester who were known as Fyffes Leicester for sponsorship purposes. There were no playoffs to determine champions after the regular season but there was a competition for the top four clubs called the Super Cup which was held at Guildford Hockey Club from 30 April - 2 May.

The Men's Cup was won by Cannock and the Women's Cup was won by Leicester.

Men's Premier Division League Standings

Women's Premier Division League Standings

Men's Super Cup Standings

Women's Super Cup Standings

Men's Cup (EHA Cup)

Quarter-finals

Semi-finals

Final 
(Held at the Canterbury on 20 March)

Women's Cup (EHA Cup)

Quarter-finals

Semi-finals

Final 
(Held at Canterbury on 20 March)

References 

England Hockey League seasons
field hockey
field hockey
England